St Catharines Milling and Lumber Co v R was the leading case on Aboriginal title in Canada for more than 80 years. The Judicial Committee of the Privy Council, affirming a ruling by the Supreme Court of Canada, held that Aboriginal title over land was allowed only at the Crown's pleasure, and could be taken away at any time. This case, involving Ojibway Treaty No. 3 which had never been previously litigated before any court, is a leading decision in Canada on the differences between the division of legislative powers and property rights under the Constitution of Canada.

Background

At issue were treaty lands thought to be within Rupert's Land when Canada entered into Treaty 3 in 1873. Following the Ontario-Manitoba Boundary Case, the Canada (Ontario Boundary) Act 1889 placed about two-thirds of the treaty area in Ontario. Canada believed that it was entitled under the Treaty, and its legislative authority under section 91 (24) of the Constitution Act, 1867 for "Indians and Lands reserved for the Indians", to administer Treaty lands. The lumber company was granted a federal permit to a timber berth on Lake Wabigoon, and that permit was challenged by the Province.

The courts below

In 1885, Chancellor Boyd of the Chancery Division held that the phrase "Lands reserved for the Indians" referred only to “Indian Reserves”, and "such words do not cover lands which have never been the subject of treaty or surrender, and as to which the Legislature or executive Government have never specifically appropriated or 'reserved' for the Indian population." On appeal, the Court of Appeal affirmed this, as well as stating that the lands transferred by the 1889 Act, other than that covered by Indian reserves, vested in the Crown in right of Ontario. This was affirmed on appeal to the Supreme Court of Canada.

At the Privy Council

The SCC ruling was affirmed by the Board. Lord Watson identified the source of Aboriginal title as the Royal Proclamation of 1763, and he noted:

Impact

Other issues arose from this decision. The Privy Council said, for example, that Ontario must relieve Canada of its obligations under the treaty since Ontario had the benefit of it, but subsequent litigation by Canada failed on that point too. In Ontario Mining Co. v. Seybold, the Privy Council extended the rule to deny the Indians any beneficial interest in the reserves that had been set apart for them under the Treaty. It took a series of federal/provincial agreements, culminating in the Canada/Ontario Indian Reserve Lands Agreement, to provide an interim solution to the problems created these decisions. A further resolution was reached in 1986, with the passage of the Indian Lands Agreement (1986) Act.

Even though some of Lord Watson's observations were later varied by the Supreme Court of Canada in Guerin v. The Queen, this case is the starting point for an understanding of Aboriginal law in Canada.

References

Further reading 

 Aboriginal land title in Canada

External links
 summary of the case

1888 in Canadian case law
Canadian Aboriginal case law
Judicial Committee of the Privy Council cases on appeal from Canada
Supreme Court of Canada cases
Aboriginal title in Canada
1888 in Ontario
Land case law